Frontier Outpost is a 1950 American Western film directed by Ray Nazarro and starring Charles Starrett, Lois Hall and Steve Darrell. It is part of the Durango Kid series.

Cast
 Charles Starrett as Steve Lawton / Durango Kid 
 Lois Hall as Alice Tanner 
 Steve Darrell as Forsythe 
 Fred F. Sears as Major Copeland 
 Robert J. Wilke as Krag Benson 
 Hank Penny as Guitar Player 
 Slim Duncan as Fiddle Player 
 Smiley Burnette as Smiley Burnette

References

Bibliography
 Blottner, Gene. Columbia Pictures Movie Series, 1926-1955: The Harry Cohn Years. McFarland, 2011.

External links
 

1950 films
1950 Western (genre) films
1950s English-language films
American Western (genre) films
Films directed by Ray Nazarro
Columbia Pictures films
American black-and-white films
1950s American films